The Schönleber Vento is a German ultralight trike designed and produced by Schönleber Metallbau GbR of Schönaich and formerly located in Regensburg. The aircraft is supplied complete and ready-to-fly.

Design and development
The company has been producing ultralight trikes since the 1990s, mostly to supply local customers and without advertising. The company's main business is metal fabrication.

The aircraft design features a cable-braced hang glider-style high-wing, weight-shift controls, a two-seats-in-tandem open cockpit with an optional cockpit fairing, tricycle landing gear and a single engine in pusher configuration.

The aircraft is made from bolted-together aluminum tubing, with its double surface wing covered in Dacron sailcloth. Its  span wing is supported by a single tube-type kingpost and uses an "A" frame weight-shift control bar. The powerplant is a twin cylinder, liquid-cooled, two-stroke, dual-ignition  Rotax 582 engine, equipped with a 4:1 belt reduction drive to reduce the aircraft's noise signature.

A number of different wings can be fitted to the basic carriage, including a special wing for hang glider towing.

Specifications (Vento)

References

Vento
2010s German sport aircraft
2010s German ultralight aircraft
Single-engined pusher aircraft
Ultralight trikes
Glider tugs